Ronald Jason Klein (born July 10, 1957) is an American politician and lawyer who is a former member of the United States House of Representatives for .  He is a member of the Democratic Party and chairs the Jewish Democratic Council of America. He previously served in the Florida House of Representatives and the Florida Senate. He is currently employed by the law firm Holland & Knight.

Early life, education and career
Klein was born in Cleveland, Ohio. He graduated from Cleveland Heights High School in 1975, and attended Ohio State University, graduating with a Bachelor of Arts degree in political science in 1979. While at Ohio State, Klein became a member of the Alpha Epsilon Pi fraternity.  Klein also spent time during college as an intern at the Ohio General Assembly. Klein attended Case Western Reserve University School of Law and graduated with a J.D. degree in 1982.

Florida Legislature 
In 1992, Klein defeated ten-year incumbent Steve Press in the Democratic primary to win a seat in the Florida House of Representatives. Klein was elected to the Florida Senate in 1996, and served as minority whip in 1998 and as minority leader in 2002–2004.

U.S. House of Representatives

Committee assignments
Committee on Financial Services
Subcommittee on Capital Markets, Insurance and Government Sponsored Enterprises
Subcommittee on Financial Institutions and Consumer Credit
Committee on Foreign Affairs
Subcommittee on Terrorism, Nonproliferation and Trade
Subcommittee on the Middle East and South Asia
Subcommittee on the Western Hemisphere

On September 29, 2008, Klein voted for the Emergency Economic Stabilization Act of 2008 During the 111th Congress, he voted for the American Recovery and Reinvestment Act of 2009, American Clean Energy and Security Act of 2009, and both healthcare bills, Affordable Health Care for America Act which was the House bill and Patient Protection and Affordable Care Act which was the Senate bill. He also voted for the reconciliation bill and Dodd-Frank.

Political campaigns

2006

Klein ran for a seat in the U.S. House of Representatives in Florida's 22nd congressional district against 13-term Republican incumbent Clay Shaw. Although Shaw won re-election easily in the 2004 election (his opponent dropped out before the election), John Kerry carried the district by a margin on 50-48 percent over George W. Bush in 2004.

On Election Day 2006, Klein defeated Shaw by a margin of 51%-48% and assumed office when the 110th Congress convened on January 4, 2007. Klein was aided by voter discontent over the war in Iraq and the scandal involving Republican Congressman Mark Foley in the neighboring district.

On December 18, 2007, the magazine Politico named Ron Klein as its "Rookie of the Year", citing his willingness to cross party lines and his ability to get major legislation passed.

2008

In 2008, Klein won his race against Republican nominee Allen West with 54.7% of the vote.

Klein voted with a majority of his Democratic colleagues 97.9% of the time during the 111th Congress. The nonpartisan National Journal rated him as 58.3 percent liberal and 41.7 conservative based on his voting record.

2010

Klein lost his reelection bid to Republican nominee Allen West in a rematch of the 2008 race.

Post-Congressional career
After leaving Congress, Klein was hired by law firm Holland & Knight.

Personal life
Ron married Dori Dragin in 1982 and they moved to Boca Raton, Florida in 1985. They have two children.

See also
 Homeowner's Defense Act
 List of Jewish members of the United States Congress

References

External links
Ron Klein Bio at Holland & Knight
Ron Klein for Congress official campaign site
 

|-

|-

|-

|-

 

1957 births
Living people
American lobbyists
Florida lawyers
Democratic Party Florida state senators
Democratic Party members of the Florida House of Representatives
Ohio State University College of Arts and Sciences alumni
People from Boca Raton, Florida
Democratic Party members of the United States House of Representatives from Florida
Politicians from Cleveland
Case Western Reserve University School of Law alumni
Jewish members of the United States House of Representatives
21st-century American politicians
Lawyers from Cleveland
Holland & Knight people
Cleveland Heights High School alumni
21st-century American Jews
Members of Congress who became lobbyists